Marjani may refer to:

Marjani akritidu in Jesenik, Czechia
Shihabetdin Marjani - 19th century Tatar theologian and historian
A song in the movie Billu